Finella geayi is a species of minute sea snail, a marine gastropod mollusk or micromollusk in the family Scaliolidae.

Description

The Finella Geayi is a small snail. It lives in brown or white spiral shells. Its body is white and secretes a white mucus substance.

Distribution

References

 Dautzenberg, Ph. (1929). Mollusques testaces marins de Madagascar. Faune des Colonies Francaises, Tome III

Scaliolidae
Gastropods described in 1910